The Bishop of Dover is an episcopal title used by a suffragan bishop of the Church of England Diocese of Canterbury, England. The title takes its name after the town of Dover in Kent. The Bishop of Dover holds the additional title of "Bishop in Canterbury" and is empowered to act almost as if the Bishop of Dover were the diocesan bishop of Canterbury, since the actual diocesan bishop (the Archbishop of Canterbury) is based at Lambeth Palace in London, and thus is frequently away from the diocese, fulfilling national and international duties. Among other things, this gives the Bishop of Dover an ex officio seat in the church's General Synod. There is another suffragan, the Bishop of Maidstone, who has different responsibilities.

The role of the Bishop of Dover in the Diocese of Canterbury is comparable to that of the Cardinal Vicar in the Roman Catholic Diocese of Rome, who exercises most functions that the Pope, the Bishop of Rome, formally has in his own diocese. The arrangements by which the Bishop of Dover acts as if the Bishop of Dover were the diocesan bishop date from 1980, under provisions in Section 10 of the Dioceses Measure 1978. The 2001 report To Lead and to Serve recommended making these arrangement more permanent and styling the pseudo–diocesan bishop as "Bishop in Canterbury"; that style was already in use before the review.

The current bishop of Dover is Rose Hudson-Wilkin. She was consecrated at St Paul's Cathedral on 19 November 2019  and installed at Canterbury Cathedral on 30 November 2019.

List of bishops of Dover

References

External links
 Crockford's Clerical Directory - Listings